Mirela Gawłowska is a Polish former competitive figure skater. She is a six-time Polish national champion. She qualified for the free skate at four ISU Championships – 1988 Worlds in Budapest, 1987 Europeans in Sarajevo, 1988 Europeans in Prague, and 1989 Europeans in Birmingham. She was coached by Zygmunt Kaczmarczyk. Her skating club was Naprzód Janów.

Competitive highlights

References 

Polish female single skaters
Living people
Sportspeople from Katowice
Year of birth missing (living people)